The West Main Street Historic District of Westborough, Massachusetts is an expansive historic district that encompasses a large residential portion of the historic center of the town, as well as part of its commercial center.

When first listed on the National Register of Historic Places in 1987, the district included West Main Street from its junction with Milk and South Streets (Massachusetts Route 135), west to Blake Street, along with streets running northwest to Whitney Street.  It was extended in 1990 to include properties further west on West Main Street (nearly to Chestnut Street), and again in 2006 to include properties south of West Main Street between South Street on the east and Charles and Ruggles Streets in the west, and abutting the Cedar Swamp Archeological District to the southeast.  In 2009 it was extended a third time, to include a cluster of streets north of Milk Street and west of East Main Street.

See also
National Register of Historic Places listings in Worcester County, Massachusetts

References

Historic districts in Worcester County, Massachusetts
National Register of Historic Places in Worcester County, Massachusetts
Buildings and structures in Westborough, Massachusetts
Historic districts on the National Register of Historic Places in Massachusetts